The grass coqui or coqui de las hierbas (Eleutherodactylus brittoni) is a species of frog in the family Eleutherodactylidae, endemic to Puerto Rico.
Its natural habitats are subtropical or tropical moist lowland forest, subtropical or tropical moist montane forest, subtropical or tropical seasonally wet or flooded lowland grassland, plantations, rural gardens, and heavily degraded former forest.
It is threatened by habitat loss.

See also

Fauna of Puerto Rico
List of amphibians and reptiles of Puerto Rico

References

Eleutherodactylus
Amphibians of Puerto Rico
Endemic fauna of Puerto Rico
Amphibians described in 1920
Taxonomy articles created by Polbot